Sanjay Dulichand Rathod is a Shiv Sena politician from Yavatmal district, Maharashtra. He is a member of the Maharashtra Legislative Assembly from Digras-Darwha Assembly Constituency.Rathod belongs to the Banjara community. He won 2014 assembly election with record margin of 79,864, second highest in Maharashtra.

Political career
 2004: Elected to Maharashtra Legislative Assembly (1st term)
 2009: Re-Elected to Maharashtra Legislative Assembly (2nd term) 
 2014: Re-Elected to Maharashtra Legislative Assembly (3rd term) 
 2014 - 2019: Minister of State for Revenue in Maharashtra State Government
 2014: Guardian minister of Yavatmal district
 2015: Guardian minister of Washim district
 2019: Re-Elected to Maharashtra Legislative Assembly (4th term)
 2019: Appointed minister of Forest, Disaster Management, Relief and Rehabilitation
 2020: Appointed guardian minister of Yavatmal district
He resigned from the cabinet in 2021.  

 2022 : Appointed Cabinet Minister of Ministry of Food and Drug Administration (Maharashtra) in Maharashtra State Government.

See also
 Uddhav Thackeray ministry
 Devendra Fadnavis ministry

References

External links
 Shiv Sena Home Page
 http://www.rediff.com/news/report/fadnavis-ministry-expansion-sees-mix-of-old-and-new-faces/20141205.htm
 http://www.dnaindia.com/mumbai/report-maharashtra-cm-devendra-fadnavis-team-portfolios-allocated-bjp-retains-key-departments-2041510
 Profile of Maharashtra government ministers 

Maharashtra MLAs 2014–2019
Living people
Shiv Sena politicians
People from Yavatmal district
Maharashtra MLAs 2004–2009
Maharashtra MLAs 2009–2014
1971 births